Thrasyvoulos Manos (1835-1922) was an officer, later Major general of the Hellenic Army.

Early life and ancestry
Born in 1835, to the Phanariot Manos family, he was the son of the poet, writer and philosopher Konstatinos Manos (1785-1835) and his wife, Sevastia Argyropoulos (1806-1883). His father was the grandson of Nicholas Caradja, Prince of Wallachia, while his mother was the granddaughter of Michael Drakos Soutzos, Prince of Moldavia.

Biography 
He entered the Hellenic Military Academy and graduated as an artillery officer. He joined the Cretan uprising of 1866 as a volunteer, but was wounded and taken prisoner by the Ottomans at the battle of Vafe. He was brought to Constantinople, but managed to escape and return to Greece.

During the Greco-Turkish War of 1897, he led the Greek forces in the Epirus front. After the war he was accused of negligence and blamed for the poor performance of Greek troops, but was exonerated and published an account of the campaign. 

He retired with the rank of major general on 29 January 1918, and died at Athens in 1922.

Personal life 
On September 1868 in Paris, he was married to Roxane Mavromichalis (1848-1905). They were parents of the politician and poet Konstantinos Manos, and the army officer Petros Manos, who was the father of Aspasia Manos, the consort of King Alexander of Greece.

References

Further reading
 

1835 births
1922 deaths
19th-century Greek military personnel
20th-century Greek military personnel
Greek military personnel of the Greco-Turkish War (1897)
Greek prisoners of war
Hellenic Army major generals
Thrasyvoulos
Prisoners of war held by the Ottoman Empire
Greek escapees
People from Nafplion